Adenomera is a genus of leptodactylid frogs, sometimes known as tropical bullfrogs, found in South America east of the Andes. The genus was  until recently considered a synonym of Leptodactylus.

Species
The following species are recognised in the genus Adenomera:

References

 
Leptodactylinae
Amphibians of South America
Amphibian genera
Taxa named by Franz Steindachner